A severe thunderstorm warning (SAME code: SVR) is a severe weather warning product of the National Weather Service that is issued by regional offices of weather forecasting agencies throughout the world to alert the public that severe thunderstorms are imminent or occurring.  
A severe thunderstorm warning is issued when Doppler weather radar, trained storm spotters or local emergency management personnel indicate that a thunderstorm is producing large hail and high winds capable of causing significant damage, and is expected to continue producing severe weather along the storm's projected track. Flooding is also sometimes caused by torrential rainfall produced by a thunderstorm. (In these cases, a flood advisory or flash flood warning may be issued to alert the public of the flooding threat.)

Definition
A severe thunderstorm warning indicates the warned area is in impending danger from hail or wind speeds meeting warning criteria as well as from lightning and hydrological impacts associated with the storm cell. Severe thunderstorms can and do produce tornadoes without warning. While not all severe thunderstorms produce tornadoes, they can produce serious straight line wind damage as severe as a lower-category tornado or hurricane, and can actually cover a much wider area than that exceeded by a tornado's comparatively relative narrow path width.

If a tornado is detected on radar or is sighted visually, a tornado warning will be issued either in replacement of or concurrently to the existing severe thunderstorm warning. Generally, but not always, a severe thunderstorm watch or tornado watch (or a regional equivalent thereof) will precede a warning. If a tornado warning is issued, based on Doppler weather radar, it means strong rotation has been detected within a thunderstorm. Usually, if a thunderstorm is producing only weak rotation, it will only yield hazardous weather warranting a severe thunderstorm warning. However, the public will usually be advised this type of rotation has been detected and that the storm in question should be watched closely in the near future for further intensification.

Regional basis and criteria

United States
Severe thunderstorm warnings are issued by the National Weather Service through the agency's local Weather Forecast Offices, which utilize WarnGen software integrated into the Advance Weather Interactive Processing System (AWIPS) to generate the warning statement; it is then disseminated through various communication routes accessed by the media and various agencies, on the internet, to NOAA satellites, over NOAA Weather Radio and, depending on the storm's severity and at the office's discretion, via activation of the Emergency Alert System to local broadcast media and Wireless Emergency Alerts for cellular phones.

Local NWS forecast offices outline warnings for tornadoes and severe thunderstorms in polygonal shapes for map-based weather hazard products distributed to the main agency, individual forecast office websites and the Storm Prediction Center (including open-source APIs available for free use to public weather websites and mobile apps), based on the storm's projected path as determined by Doppler radar at the time of the warning's issuance. In NWS text products, warnings are usually illustrated by individual counties, parishes or other county-equivalent jurisdictions (sections or the entirety thereof, and in list format if it covers more than one jurisdiction), particularly dependent on the jurisdiction's total land area. Prior to October 2007, warnings were issued by the National Weather Service on a per-county basis. SPC and NWS products as well as severe weather alert displays used by some television stations typically highlight severe thunderstorm warnings with a yellow or orange polygon or filled county/parish/equivalent jurisdiction outline.

The NWS has the option of adding enhanced wording to severe thunderstorm warnings and update statements issued as a Severe Weather Statement (SVS)—"particularly dangerous situation" (PDS), "severe thunderstorm emergency", or, as used by some Central and Southern Region offices as indicative PDS wording, "this is a very dangerous storm"—when an extremely intense severe thunderstorm expected to impact a densely populated area contains very large hailstones and/or intense straight-line winds capable of causing major structural damage (especially to roofs, windows, siding and structures of poor construction such as outbuildings and mobile homes), and severe injury if not death to people and animals exposed outdoors (from either repeated hail-induced blunt trauma or wind-generated debris). Although it is an unofficial alert product, a "severe thunderstorm emergency" statement—an extension of the tornado emergency statements issued to warn of a violent tornado impacting populated areas—is the highest and most urgent level relating to non-tornadic severe thunderstorms. When a threat of tornadic activity exists (especially if a tornado watch is in effect), local NWS forecast offices, particularly those in the Great Plains or Southeastern U.S., will sometimes include a safety precaution action statement indicating "Severe thunderstorms can produce tornadoes with no advance warning..." or similar wording in their severe thunderstorm warnings to advise the public to keep abreast of possible tornado development and any tornado warnings that may be issued.

As part of the agency’s March 2012 implementation of a multi-tier Impact Based Warning (IBW) system to notify the public and emergency management officials of the severity of specific severe weather phenomena, National Weather Service-issued severe thunderstorm warnings and associated Severe Weather Statements providing updated storm information include event tags at the bottom of the product text providing summarical estimates of straight-line wind speeds (sustained or gusts) and hail size and, when applicable, an indication of possible tornadic development. The product text will also provide a summary of impacts to life and property that may be caused the hailstones and winds being produced by the parent thunderstorm. Initially implemented at six NWS offices in Kansas and Missouri, the categorical threat and damage indicator text—which are applicable to all of the agency’s Weather Forecast Offices, primarily those operating within the agency's Central and Southern Region divisions—were expanded to 33 additional Central Region WFOs in March 2013; eight additional offices operating within the Eastern, Southern and Western Region divisions began using the IBW indicators in March 2014. The entire agency began using the format in 2016. The threat indicators consist of three coded taglines, ascending by observational level:
 Tornado – indicates the mesocyclone of the parent severe thunderstorm is producing circulation at or near the cloud base, which may warrant the issuance of a tornado warning if base-level rotation strengthens. When incorporated into the storm impact summary, the tornado tag (appearing in applicable severe thunderstorm warning products as “TORNADO...POSSIBLE”) will precede the wind and hail tags.
 Hail – indicates the estimated size of hail (measured in inches) being produced by the parent severe thunderstorm (e.g., “HAIL...1.25IN”). When included, the “Impact” section of the warning text will describe potential damage impacts from the hailstones, with the impact message varying in severity depending on radar estimated or observed reports of measured large hail (e.g., “Hail damage to vehicles is expected.”) and the “Hazard” section will provide a comparison of the size of hailstones to objects of similar size (e.g., “baseball size hail” for hailstones measuring 2.75"). (If the tag lists either “HAIL...0.00IN”, indicating no hail is accompanying the storm, or “HAIL...<.75IN”, indicating hailstones below severe criteria that may range in equivalent size from peas [.25"] to pennies [.75"], no hail size will be indicated in the “Hazard” row nor will a description of damage risk will be included in the “Impact” section.)
 Wind – indicates estimated speed (in miles per hour) of wind gusts produced by the parent thunderstorm (e.g., “WIND...70MPH”). When included, the “Impact” section of the warning text will describe potential damage impacts from the straight-line winds, varying in severity depending on wind strength (e.g., “Expect considerable tree damage. Wind damage is also likely to mobile homes, roofs, and outbuildings.”).

Since July 28, 2021 (or as late as August 2 in certain County Warning Areas), the NWS has incorporated categorical damage threat indicators for higher-end hail and/or wind events at the bottom of text products for severe thunderstorm warnings (including update statements to existing warnings issued as Severe Weather Statements):
(Warnings assigned this indicator incorporate the notation "THIS IS A DESTRUCTIVE STORM FOR[...]"—which superseded the boilerplate "this is a particularly dangerous situation" wording—between the storm summary and hazard information in the product text to indicate certain areas under greatest threat from the criterial wind speeds and/or hail size.)
Similar to the indicators used for tornado warnings since the 2013 implementation of its Impact Based Warning system, the categorical criteria—which will be applicable to all NWS Weather Forecast Offices—was introduced to further explain to the public of the dangers of some thunderstorms, especially those that occur in the Great Plains, that can produce massive hailstones of baseball size or larger that may fall fast enough to severely injure if not kill a person by repeated blunt trauma, and winds that can cause damage equivalent to hurricanes and tornadoes (especially to roofs and weaker structures such as outbuildings and mobile homes). When deemed necessary, initial warnings and Severe Weather Statement updates containing the "destructive" tag will be disseminated as Wireless Emergency Alerts.

Canada
Environment and Climate Change Canada issues severe thunderstorm warnings through regional offices of the Meteorological Service of Canada based in Vancouver, Edmonton, Winnipeg, Toronto, Montreal and Dartmouth for specified municipalities and census subdivisions, sometimes including areas adjacent to a particular warned thunderstorm that are not in the immediate approximate path but may experience severe weather from adjacent thunderstorms during the warning timeframe. Warnings are disseminated to the public through broadcast and online media outlets, and Weatheradio Canada; depending on storm severity and regional office discretion, the warning may require activation  of the National Public Alerting System (Alert Ready) and feeding provincial alerting systems (such as Alberta Emergency Alert and SaskAlert) to distribute the alert to local broadcast media and cellular phones.

United Kingdom
The Met Office issues de facto severe thunderstorm warnings through general-purpose weather warning products disseminated by the National Severe Weather Warning Service (classified as yellow, amber or red, depending on storm severity and proximity to the time of expected onset of storm impacts).

Australia
Severe thunderstorm warnings are issued by regional offices of the Bureau of Meteorology (BOM) based in Melbourne Docklands, Adelaide, Darwin, Perth and Brisbane. BOM-issued severe thunderstorm warnings are outlined as either a broad-based warning, covering expected impacts within a weather reporting area, or as a detailed warning, when a thunderstorm is within weather-watch radar range and includes a map depicting any existing thunderstorms and the forecast direction of movement for up to 60 minutes.

New Zealand
MetService issues severe thunderstorm warnings to alert regions expected to experience severe weather phenomena meeting regional criteria and utilize the Common Alerting Protocol (CAP) to generate the warning statement. The warning is then disseminated to the public through terrestrial television and radio stations, online media, mobile app and SMS messaging through Emergency Mobile Alert (EMA); if a tornado has been sighted or indicated by radar within the warned area during the severe thunderstorm warning's duration, civil defense sirens, if present, are usually activated within the region to be affected to inform people who are present outdoors of the approaching tornado threat.

Philippines
In the Philippines, a severe thunderstorm is defined by the Philippine Atmospheric, Geophysical and Astronomical Services Administration (PAGASA) as having strong winds, large hail, torrential rainfall, tornadoes, flash flooding and/or landslides. PAGASA, through its regional services divisions, issue thunderstorm advisories to alert regions and/or provinces expected to experience severe weather phenomena meeting regional criteria within a period of two hours. Warnings are disseminated to the public through terrestrial television and radio outlets, online media, and via SMS messages through the National Disaster Risk Reduction and Management Council's Emergency Cell Broadcast System.

Criteria in various countries

Examples of severe thunderstorm warnings

Here is an example of a Severe Thunderstorm Warning issued by the National weather service in  San Angelo TX
Severe Thunderstorm Warning
VAC059-153-600-683-685-140130-
/O.NEW.KLWX.SV.W.0529.190814T0058Z-190814T0130Z/
Severe Thunderstorm Warning
TXC151-253-042245-
/O.NEW.KSJT.SV.W.0017.220404T2223Z-220404T2245Zny

BULLETIN - IMMEDIATE BROADCAST REQUESTED
Severe Thunderstorm Warning
National Weather Service San Angelo TX
523 PM CDT Mon Apr 4 2022

The National Weather Service in San Angelo has issued a

* Severe Thunderstorm Warning for...
  Western Jones County in west central Texas...
  East central Fisher County in west central Texas...

* Until 545 PM CDT.

* At 521 PM CDT, a severe thunderstorm was located near Neinda,
  moving east at 40 mph.

  HAZARD...60 mph wind gusts and quarter size hail.

  SOURCE...Radar indicated.

  IMPACT...Hail damage to vehicles is expected. Expect wind damage
           to roofs, siding, and trees.

* This severe thunderstorm will be near...
  Neinda around 525 PM CDT.
  Anson around 540 PM CDT.

Other locations impacted by this severe thunderstorm include Truby
and The Intersection Of Us-180 And Ranch Road 126.

PRECAUTIONARY/PREPAREDNESS ACTIONS...

For your protection move to an interior room on the lowest floor of a
building.

To report severe weather, contact your nearest law enforcement
agency. They will send your report to the National Weather Service
office in San Angelo.

Large hail and damaging winds and continuous cloud to ground
lightning is occurring with this storm. Move indoors immediately.
Lightning is one of nature`s leading killers. Remember, if you can
hear thunder, you are close enough to be struck by lightning.

Torrential rainfall is occurring with this storm, and may lead to
flash flooding. Do not drive your vehicle through flooded roadways.

&&

LAT...LON 3261 10025 3276 10031 3294 9990 3263 9981
TIME...MOT...LOC 2221Z 258DEG 33KT 3271 10012

HAIL THREAT...RADAR INDICATED
MAX HAIL SIZE...1.00 IN
WIND THREAT...RADAR INDICATED
MAX WIND GUST...60 MPH

$$

TP

This is a Severe Thunderstorm Warning issued for a cluster of severe thunderstorms.

Severe Thunderstorm Warning
ALC003-FLC033-113-130200-
/O.NEW.KMOB.SV.W.0225.200713T0114Z-200713T0200Z/

BULLETIN - IMMEDIATE BROADCAST REQUESTED
Severe Thunderstorm Warning
National Weather Service Mobile AL
814 PM CDT Sun Jul 12 2020

The National Weather Service in Mobile has issued a

* Severe Thunderstorm Warning for...
  Southeastern Baldwin County in southwestern Alabama...
  West central Santa Rosa County in northwestern Florida...
  Escambia County in northwestern Florida...

* Until 900 PM CDT.
* At 813 PM CDT, a cluster of severe thunderstorms was located near
  Bay Minette, moving southeast at 35 mph.

  HAZARD...60 mph wind gusts.

  SOURCE...Radar indicated.

  IMPACT...Expect damage to roofs, siding, and trees.

* Locations impacted include...
  Ensley, Gonzalez, Bay Minette, Pace, Lillian, Molino and Perdido
  Beach.

PRECAUTIONARY/PREPAREDNESS ACTIONS...

For your protection move to an interior room on the lowest floor of a
building.

Damaging winds and continuous cloud to ground lightning is occurring
with this storm. Move indoors immediately.
Lightning is one of nature`s leading killers. Remember, if you can
hear thunder, you are close enough to be struck by lightning.

Torrential rainfall is occurring with this storm, and may lead to
flash flooding. Do not drive your vehicle through flooded roadways.

&&

LAT...LON 3022 8750 3092 8781 3099 8770 3070 8706
TIME...MOT...LOC 0113Z 301DEG 31KT 3084 8779

HAIL...<.75IN
WIND...60MPH

$$

CGAL

This is a Severe Thunderstorm Warning with a "considerable" tag to denote that 70 mph wind gusts were possible.
 �
 664
 WUUS53 KLBF 052239
 SVRLBF
 NEC017-031-052300-
 /O.NEW.KLBF.SV.W.0108.210805T2239Z-210805T2300Z/
 
 BULLETIN - IMMEDIATE BROADCAST REQUESTED
 Severe Thunderstorm Warning
 National Weather Service North Platte NE
 539 PM CDT Thu Aug 5 2021
 
 The National Weather Service in North Platte has issued a
 
 * Severe Thunderstorm Warning for...
   East central Cherry County in north central Nebraska...
   Southwestern Brown County in north central Nebraska...
 
 * Until 600 PM CDT.
 
 * At 539 PM CDT, a severe thunderstorm was located 12 miles southwest
   of Johnstown, or 18 miles southwest of Ainsworth, moving southeast
   at 30 mph.
 
   HAZARD...70 mph wind gusts and quarter size hail.
 
   SOURCE...Radar indicated.
 
   IMPACT...Hail damage to vehicles is expected. Expect considerable
            tree damage. Wind damage is also likely to mobile homes,
            roofs, and outbuildings.
 
 * Locations impacted include...
   Moon Lake, Willow Lake State Wildlife Management Area and Long Lake
   State Wildlife Management Area.
 
 PRECAUTIONARY/PREPAREDNESS ACTIONS...
 
 For your protection move to an interior room on the lowest floor of a
 building.
 
 &&
 
 LAT...LON 4244 10033 4249 10019 4227 9991 4219 10022
 TIME...MOT...LOC 2239Z 327DEG 26KT 4242 10018
 
 THUNDERSTORM DAMAGE THREAT...CONSIDERABLE
 HAIL THREAT...RADAR INDICATED
 MAX HAIL SIZE...1.00 IN
 WIND THREAT...RADAR INDICATED
 MAX WIND GUST...70 MPH
 
 $$
 
 Sporer

This is a Severe Thunderstorm Warning with "destructive" wording to denote that three-inch hail was possible with this storm, with a request for activation the Emergency Alert System.
 �
 115
 WUUS53 KLBF 052249
 SVRLBF
 NEC089-149-052330-
 /O.NEW.KLBF.SV.W.0109.210805T2249Z-210805T2330Z/
 
 BULLETIN - EAS ACTIVATION REQUESTED
 Severe Thunderstorm Warning
 National Weather Service North Platte NE
 549 PM CDT Thu Aug 5 2021
 
 The National Weather Service in North Platte has issued a
 
 * Severe Thunderstorm Warning for...
   Northeastern Rock County in north central Nebraska...
   Southwestern Holt County in north central Nebraska...
 
 * Until 630 PM CDT.
 
 * At 548 PM CDT, a severe thunderstorm was located near Newport, or
   15 miles east of Bassett, moving southeast at 40 mph.
 
   THIS IS A DESTRUCTIVE STORM APPROACHING STUART!
 
   HAZARD...Three inch hail and 70 mph wind gusts.
 
   SOURCE...Radar indicated.
 
   IMPACT...People and animals outdoors will be severely injured.
            Expect shattered windows, extensive damage to roofs,
            siding, and vehicles.
 
 * Locations impacted include...
   O'neill, O'Neill, Atkinson, Stuart, Newport and Emmet.
 
 This includes the following highways...
  Highway 20 between mile markers 265 and 308.
  Highway 281 between mile markers 183 and 189.
 
 PRECAUTIONARY/PREPAREDNESS ACTIONS...
 
 For your protection move to an interior room on the lowest floor of a
 building.
 
 Prepare immediately for large hail and damaging winds. People outside
 should move immediately to shelter inside a strong building. Stay
 away from windows.
 
 This is a dangerous storm. Prepare immediately for large destructive
 hail capable of producing significant damage. People outside should
 move to shelter inside a strong building,  and stay away from
 windows.
 
 &&
 
 LAT...LON 4256 9946 4274 9928 4252 9857 4224 9884
 TIME...MOT...LOC 2248Z 300DEG 33KT 4262 9924
 
 THUNDERSTORM DAMAGE THREAT...DESTRUCTIVE
 HAIL THREAT...RADAR INDICATED
 MAX HAIL SIZE...3.00 IN
 WIND THREAT...RADAR INDICATED
 MAX WIND GUST...70 MPH
 
 $$
 
 Sporer
On August 16, 2019 at 1:31 a.m. MDT, the National Weather Service in Cheyenne, Wyoming incorporated the "emergency" wording into a Severe Thunderstorm Warning. In this instance, the "severe thunderstorm emergency" statement was included to denote that  diameter hail (as confirmed by storm spotter reports) was imminent in portions of Scotts Bluff, Banner and Sioux Counties in Nebraska, specifically areas around the towns of Scottsbluff and Gering.

�
187 
WWUS55 KCYS 160731
SVSCYS

Severe Weather Statement
National Weather Service Cheyenne WY
131 AM MDT Fri Aug 16 2019

NEC007-157-165-160815-
/O.CON.KCYS.SV.W.0342.000000T0000Z-190816T0815Z/
Scotts Bluff NE-Banner NE-Sioux NE-
131 AM MDT Fri Aug 16 2019

...A SEVERE THUNDERSTORM WARNING REMAINS IN EFFECT UNTIL 215 AM MDT
FOR SCOTTS BLUFF...NORTHEASTERN BANNER AND SOUTHEASTERN SIOUX
COUNTIES...

...THIS IS A SEVERE THUNDERSTORM EMERGENCY FOR SCOTTSBLUFF AND 
GERING!...

At 129 AM MDT, a severe thunderstorm was located near Scotts Bluff 
National Monument, or near Scottsbluff, moving east at 40 mph. 3 
INCH DIAMETER HAIL IS IMMINENT! PREPARE NOW FOR DESTRUCTIVE HAIL!

This is a very dangerous storm!

HAZARD...Three inch hail and 60 mph wind gusts.

SOURCE...Trained weather spotters.

IMPACT...People and animals outdoors will be severely injured. 
         Expect shattered windows, extensive damage to roofs, 
         siding, and vehicles.

Locations impacted include...
Scottsbluff, Gering, Mitchell, Terrytown, Minatare, Wildcat Hills
State Recreation Area, Lake Minatare Campground, Wildcat Hills
Campground, Scotts Bluff National Monument, Hubbard Hill, Scottsbluff
Airport, Lake Minatare, Lake Alice, Melbeta and McGrew.

PRECAUTIONARY/PREPAREDNESS ACTIONS...

For your protection move to an interior room on the lowest floor of a
building.

This is a dangerous storm. Prepare immediately for large destructive
hail capable of producing significant damage. People outside should
move to a shelter, inside a strong building and away from windows.

&&

LAT...LON 4185 10394 4233 10379 4230 10344 4209 10345
      4209 10340 4200 10340 4198 10336 4156 10337
      4170 10388
TIME...MOT...LOC 0729Z 288DEG 34KT 4189 10374

HAIL...3.00IN
WIND...60MPH
 
$$

Lyons

See also
 Convective storm detection
 Severe thunderstorm watch
 Severe weather
 Severe weather terminology (United States)
 SKYWARN
 Supercell

References

External links
 Bureau of Meteorology: Severe Thunderstorm Warnings
 Meteorological Service of Canada
 United States National Weather Service

Weather warnings and advisories